The Pitchforks of Duke University, commonly referred to as "The Duke Pitchforks" or just "The Pitchforks", is Duke University's oldest continuing a cappella group. (In the late 1960s, there was a previous Duke men's group called "Chanticleer" (not to be confused with the San Francisco "Chanticleer"). One of its members was Robert Aubry Davis).  The Pitchforks constitute one of Duke's two current all-male ensembles. Founded in 1979 with four members of a Duke Medical School quartet, the Pitchforks have performed across the world; they have sung for the Chicago Bulls and Durham Bulls, performed for Duke Men's Basketball, showcased for the Queen of Jordan, and opened for artists such as Ben Folds (2009) and The Band Perry (2015).

The Pitchforks have a long history of studio recording. They have released over 15 albums so far, two of which, "Bring It Back" (2006) and "Disconcert" (2008), won the Contemporary A Cappella Recording Award (CARA) for Best Male Collegiate Album. Seven of their tracks have been featured on the Best of College A Cappella (BOCA) compilation albums. The Pitchforks are best known for their rendition of "Black and Gold" (originally by Sam Sparro), which has over 1.4 million streams on Spotify.

From 1980 until 2013, the Pitchforks were led and mentored by Benjamin F. Ward (1948-2013) who served as both a creator and inspiration for the group. After his death in 2013, the Pitchforks got to work on an album to pay tribute to Ben and to reflect upon their future. The album, "Fall Asleep At Sunset", was released in December 2018.

History 
The Pitchforks began singing together in 1979 and was officially chartered as a Duke University student organization in 1981. The founding officers consisted of: Robert S. Clarke, Frank E. Block, James Bulleit, Elliott McCrory, and Kurt T. Uphoff.

Dr. Benjamin F. Ward was asked to be faculty advisor of The Pitchforks in 1980. By its official chartering, Ward had become a full member, serving as their Music Director, a position which he held for four years. He sang with the group and formed friendships with many of its 200 alumni until his passing in 2013. Ward helped shape the music of The Pitchforks and integrate music traditions. Most notably, Ward began The Pitchforks' Gothic Christmas Show as a project which he directed, but the show has now been held annually for more than thirty years. Even since Ward's passing, the Pitchforks continue to put on the show to honor their mentor.

The group has grown considerably over the past 30 years. At first, The Pitchforks primarily sang barbershop and traditional/folk music, such as country classic, "Carolina In My Mind" by James Taylor. As of 2019, their repertoire consists of a wide variety of music, spanning from old classics, such as The Beach Boys, to contemporary artists like Shawn Mendes and Ed Sheeran. Their rendition of "Fireflies" by Owl City won the CARA for Best Male Collegiate Arrangement in 2010.

The Pitchforks perform frequently throughout the year, in dorms, around Duke's campus, and across the world. Most notably, The Pitchforks toured Mexico City in the Spring of 2019 and made live appearances on Mexican TV shows "Xe Bandamax" and "Montse y Joe".

Philanthropy 
 The Pitchforks support a host of local organizations through hosting and performing at benefit concerts. Two of the most prominent examples of the group's philanthropy are:

Charleston HALOS 
The Pitchforks have an annual tradition of performing with the Plantation Singers in Charleston, SC to benefit Charleston HALOS. According to the HALOS website, they provide "assistance to abused and neglected children in Charleston, Berkeley and Dorchester Counties and to their kinship caregivers. Through a variety of programs and initiatives, [they] help improve the lives of these children."

Scott Carter Foundation for Pediatric Cancer Research 
The Pitchforks also host benefit concerts right at home. Every year, The Pitchforks partner with Duke University Improv, the university's only improve comedy troupe, to put on a joint Valentine's Day Show. All of the proceeds earned from the show go directly to the Scott Carter Foundation for Pediatric Cancer Research.

The Fine Arts Center (FAC) of Kershaw County 
The Pitchforks also support endeavors in the arts. They make a yearly appearance at Kershaw County, SC's Fine Arts Center for FAC Fridays in order to increase awareness of the arts within the community, to help fundraise for the center's activities, and to provide entertainment to the Kershaw County community.

Notable alumni 

 Benjamin F. Ward, American philosopher

Awards and nominations 

|-
|1999
| Contemporary A Cappella Recording Awards
|Best Male Collegiate Arrangement
|Jeff Horwich
|
|
|-
|2001
| Contemporary A Cappella Recording Awards
|Best Male Collegiate Arrangement
|"Crazy" by Jason Park
|
|
|-
| rowspan="3" |2005
| rowspan="3" | Contemporary A Cappella Recording Awards
|Best Male Collegiate Album
|Honestly
|
| rowspan="2" |
|-
|Best Male Collegiate Song
|"Write Me A Song" on Honestly
|
|-
|Best Male Collegiate Arrangement
|“Ain’t No Sunshine” by Joseph Bates
|
|
|-
| rowspan="4" |2007
| rowspan="4" | Contemporary A Cappella Recording Awards
|Best Scholastic Original Song
|"Nevermind" by Joseph Bates and Andrew Booth
|
| rowspan="3" |
|-
|Best Male Collegiate Album
|Bring It Back |Bring It Back
|
|-
|Best Male Collegiate Song
|"Hysteria" on Bring It Back|"Hysteria" on Bring It Back
|
|-
|Best Male Collegiate Solo
|Chris Bryant for "Used to Love U"
|
|
|-
| rowspan="5" |2009
| rowspan="5" | Contemporary A Cappella Recording Awards
| rowspan="2" |Best Scholastic Original Song
|"Dancin' Thru" by Chris Bryant
|
|
|-
| "As You Go" by Andrew Booth |"As You Go" by Andrew Booth
|
| rowspan="4" | 
|-
|Best Male Collegiate Album
|Disconcert|Disconcert
|
|-
|Best Male Collegiate Song
|"Atlantic" on Disconcert|"Atlantic" on Disconcert
|style="background: #F4F2B0" | 
|-
|Best Male Collegiate Arrangement
|"Atlantic" by Stephen Clark|"Atlantic" by Stephen Clark
|
|-
| rowspan="4" |2011
| rowspan="4" | Contemporary A Cappella Recording Awards
|Best Scholastic Original Song
| "Calling Out" by KC Steedle |"Calling Out" by KC Steedle
|
|
|-
|Best Male Collegiate Album
|All In|All In
|style="background: #F4F2B0" | 
| rowspan="3" |
|-
|Best Male Collegiate Song
|"Fireflies" on All In|"Fireflies" on All In
|
|-
|Best Male Collegiate Arrangement
|"Fireflies" by KC Steedle|"Fireflies" by KC Steedle
|
|-
| rowspan="5" |2013
|-
| rowspan="4" | Contemporary A Cappella Recording Awards
|Best Male Collegiate Album
| Refraction |Refraction
|style="background: #F4F2B0" | 
|
|-
|Best Male Collegiate Song
|"Bright Lights Bigger City" on Refraction|"Bright Lights Bigger City" on Refraction
|
| rowspan="2" |
|-
|Best Male Collegiate Solo
|Jay Kennedy for "Titanium"|Jay Kennedy for "Titanium"
|
|-
|Best Male Collegiate Arrangement
|"Hallelujah" by Chris Waybill|"Hallelujah" by Chris Waybill
|
|
|-
|2019
| Contemporary A Cappella Recording Awards
|Best Male Collegiate Solo
| Johnathan Chou for "Too Good at Goodbyes" |Johnathan Chou on "Too Good at Goodbyes"
|
|
|}

Best of College A Cappella Appearances 

|-
|1998
|Varsity Vocals
|Best of College A Cappella Compilation
|"All I Want"
|
|
|-
|2004
|Varsity Vocals
|Best of College A Cappella Compilation
|"Write Me A Song"|"Write Me A Song"
|
|
|-
|2006
|Varsity Vocals
|Best of College A Cappella Compilation
|"Tribute"
|
|
|-
| 2009
|Varsity Vocals
|Best of College A Cappella Compilation
|"Home"
|
|
|-
|2011
|Varsity Vocals
|Best of College A Cappella Compilation
|"Black and Gold"|"Black and Gold"
|
|
|-
|2013
|Varsity Vocals
|Best of College A Cappella Compilation
|"All of the Lights"
|
|
|-
|2019
|Varsity Vocals
|Best of College A Cappella Compilation
|"Perfect"
|
|
|}

Discography 
The Pitchforks have now produced over 15 albums, each with a unique theme and texture.

 The Pitchforks of Duke University (1983)
 It's Not Rock 'n' Roll but I Like It (1984) 
 A Few Good Cuts (1987)
 The Daze of Christmas (1988)
 Wild Pitch (1989)
 Up All Night (1990)
 Tonal Eclipse (1992)
 Underground (1994)
 Ninth Street (1996)
 Tastefully Done (1998)
 They Don't Even Know (2000)
 Bad for the Piano (2002)
 A Gothic Christmas (2003)
 Honestly (2004)
 Bring It Back (2006)
 Disconcert (2008)
 All In (2011)
 Refraction (2013)
 Camden Town - EP (2015)
 Perfect - single (2018)
 Too Good At Goodbyes - single (2018)
 Fall Asleep at Sunset (2018)
 Lost In Japan - single (2019)

Their entire discography can be found on RateMyMusic and Spotify. They are currently working on their next album, which will feature their singles "Perfect," "Too Good At Goodbyes," and "Lost In Japan".

References 

Collegiate a cappella groups
A cappella
Duke University